The women's team sprint cross-country skiing competition in the classical technique at the 2014 Sochi Olympics took place on 19 February at Laura Biathlon & Ski Complex.

Results
The races were started at 14:05.

In November 2017, Yuliya Ivanova was disqualified from the event meaning that the whole Russian team was also disqualified.

Semifinals

On 19 February Ukrainian athletes asked for and were refused permission by the International Olympic Committee (IOC) to wear black arm bands to honor those killed in the violent clashes Ukrainian's capital Kiev the previous day. According to press reports Lisohor and Serdyuk had refused to start because they had been denied to wear black arm bands. The National Olympic Committee of Ukraine claimed Serdyuk was injured.

Final

Medal ceremony 
At the medal ceremony in Sochi on 20 February, the day after the race, all medals were awarded by IOC member H.R.H. Frederik, Crown Prince of Denmark and flowers to all medalists were awarded by Mats Årjes, FIS council member.

References

Women's cross-country skiing at the 2014 Winter Olympics
Women's team sprint cross-country skiing at the Winter Olympics